Julia Vaquero Sousa (born 18 September 1970 in Chamonix, France) is a retired Spanish athlete who competed in the long-distance events. She represented her country at the 1996 Summer Olympics, as well as four World Championships.

Although born in France, at the age of two months she returned to her native A Guarda in Galicia. She is considered one of the best Galician athletes of all time.

Competition record

Personal bests
800 metres – 2:09.74 (1989)
1500 metres – 4:17.37 (Segovia 1992)
2000 metres – 5:47.81 (Nice 1996) NR
3000 metres – 8:41.23 (Nice 1996)
5000 metres – 14:44.95 (Oslo 1996) NR
10,000 metres – 31:14.51 (Barakaldo 1997)
15 kilometres – 49:33+ (Uster 1998) NR
20 kilometres – 1:06:43+ (Uster 1998) NR
Half marathon – 1:10:33 (Uster 1998)

Notes

References

External links
 
 
 
 

1970 births
Living people
Spanish female long-distance runners
Spanish female middle-distance runners
Olympic athletes of Spain
Athletes (track and field) at the 1996 Summer Olympics
Mediterranean Games silver medalists for Spain
Mediterranean Games bronze medalists for Spain
Mediterranean Games medalists in athletics
Athletes (track and field) at the 1993 Mediterranean Games
Athletes (track and field) at the 1997 Mediterranean Games
People from Chamonix
Sportspeople from Galicia (Spain)
20th-century Spanish women